Mimodacne rhodesiaca is a species of beetles in the family Erotylidae.

Description
These beetles have black elytra with two transversal yellowish bands. The club of the antenna is very large and markedly asymmetrical.

Distribution
This species can be found in the equatorial Africa.

Citations

Erotylidae
Beetles described in 1917